Taltirelin (marketed under the tradename Ceredist) is a thyrotropin-releasing hormone (TRH) analog, which mimics the physiological actions of TRH, but with a much longer half-life and duration of effects, and little development of tolerance following prolonged dosing. It has nootropic, neuroprotective and analgesic effects.

Taltirelin is primarily being researched for the treatment of spinocerebellar ataxia; limited research has also been carried out with regard to other neurodegenerative disorders, e.g., spinal muscular atrophy.

References

External links 
  Ceredist セレジスト錠 (PDF) Mitsubishi Tanabe Pharma. October 2007.

Nootropics
Imidazoles
Pyrrolidines